Events in the year 1844 in India.

Incumbents
The Viscount Hardinge, Governor-General, 1844-48.

Events

Law
Judicial Committee Act (British statute)

References

 
India
Years of the 19th century in India